Tensione No. 2 is a public art work by artist Aldo Calo located at the Lynden Sculpture Garden near Milwaukee, Wisconsin. The sculpture is an abstract made of fiberglass arranged in crescent-shaped forms stacked on each other; it is installed on a concrete pedestal on the lawn.

References

Outdoor sculptures in Milwaukee
1962 sculptures
Abstract sculptures in Wisconsin
Fiberglass sculptures in Wisconsin
1962 establishments in Wisconsin